The Scandic Hotel Ariadne is located at Värtahamnen in Stockholm, Sweden. It was built in 1989 and is 62 m tall and includes 17 floors and 283 rooms.

References

External links
Official website

Hotels in Stockholm
Hotels in Sweden
Skyscraper hotels
Skyscrapers in Sweden
Hotels established in 1989
Hotel buildings completed in 1989
Swedish companies established in 1989